Milltownpass GAA is a Gaelic Athletic Association club located in the town of Milltownpass  in County Westmeath, Ireland. It lives in the shadow of its neighbours, St. Mary's, Rochfortridge.

History
The team was founded in 1977 and participates in both men's and women's leagues.

Notable players
Sam Duncan

References

External links
 http://www.milltownpassgaa.ie/

Gaelic games clubs in County Westmeath
1977 establishments in Ireland